Placental mammals (infraclass Placentalia ) are one of the three extant subdivisions of the class Mammalia, the other two being Monotremata and Marsupialia. Placentalia contains the vast majority of extant mammals, which are partly distinguished from monotremes and marsupials in that the fetus is carried in the uterus of its mother to a relatively late stage of development. The name is something of a misnomer considering that marsupials also nourish their fetuses via a placenta, though for a relatively briefer period, giving birth to less developed young which are then nurtured for a period inside the mother's pouch.

Anatomical features
Placental mammals are anatomically distinguished from other mammals by:
 a sufficiently wide opening at the bottom of the pelvis to allow the birth of a large baby relative to the size of the mother.
 the absence of epipubic bones extending forward from the pelvis, which are found in all other mammals. (Their function in non-placental mammals is to stiffen the body during locomotion, but in placentals they would inhibit the expansion of the abdomen during pregnancy.)
 the rearmost bones of the foot fit into a socket formed by the ends of the tibia and fibula, forming a complete mortise and tenon upper ankle joint.
 the presence of a malleolus at the bottom of the fibula.

Subdivisions
Analysis of retroposon presence/absence patterns has provided a rapid, unequivocal means for revealing the evolutionary history of organisms: this has resulted in a revision in the classification of placentals. There are now thought to be three major subdivisions or lineages of placental mammals: Boreoeutheria, Xenarthra, and Afrotheria, all of which diverged from common ancestors.

The living orders of placental mammals in the three groups are:

 Magnorder Atlantogenata (armadillos, sloths, anteaters, aardvark, elephant shrews, golden moles, otter shrews, tenrecs, hyraxes, elephants, and sirenians)
 Superorder Xenarthra (armadillos, sloths, and anteaters)
 Order Cingulata (armadillos)
 Order Pilosa (sloths and anteaters) 
 Superorder Afrotheria (aardvark, elephant shrews, tenrecs, otter shrews, golden moles, hyraxes, elephants, manatees, and dugong)
 Grandorder Afroinsectiphilia 
 Order Tubulidentata (aardvark)
 Mirorder Afroinsectivora (elephant shrews, golden moles, otter shrews, and tenrecs)
 Order Afrosoricida (tenrecs, otter shrews, and golden moles)
 Order Macroscelidea (elephant shrews)
 Grandorder Paenungulata 
 Order Hyracoidea (hyraxes)
 Mirorder Tethytheria (elephants, dugongs, and manatees) 
 Order Proboscidea (elephants)
 Order Sirenia (dugongs and manatees)
 Magnorder Boreoeutheria
 Superorder Euarchontoglires (treeshrews, colugos, primates, rabbits, hares, and rodents)
 Grandorder Gliriformes
 Mirorder Glires 
 Order Lagomorpha (rabbits, hares, and pikas) 
 Order Rodentia (rodents: mice, rats, voles, squirrels, beavers, etc.)
 Grandorder Euarchonta 
 Order Scandentia (treeshrews) 
 Mirorder Primatomorpha 
 Order Dermoptera (colugos) 
 Order Primates (primates: humans, monkeys, apes, lemurs, lorises, etc.) 
 Superorder Laurasiatheria (hedgehogs, shrews, moles, whales, bats, dogs, cats, seals, and hoofed mammals)
 Order Eulipotyphla (hedgehogs, gymnures, shrews, moles, and solenodons)
 Order Chiroptera (bats)
 Order Artiodactyla (even-toed ungulates: cattle, antelope, deer, camels, pigs, whales, etc.) 
 Order Perissodactyla (odd-toed ungulates: horses, donkeys, zebras, rhinoceroses, and tapirs)
 Mirorder Ferae (pangolins, dogs, cats, bears, seals, mongooses, etc.)
 Order Pholidota (pangolins) 
 Order Carnivora (carnivorans: dogs, cats, bears, seals, mongooses, etc.)

The exact relationships among these three lineages is currently a subject of debate, and four different hypotheses have been proposed with respect to which group is basal or diverged first from other placentals. These hypotheses are Atlantogenata (basal Boreoeutheria), Epitheria (basal Xenarthra), Exafroplacentalia (basal Afrotheria) and a hypothesis supporting a near simultaneous divergence. Estimates for the divergence times among these three placental groups range from 105 to 120 million years ago (MYA), depending on the type of DNA (e.g. nuclear or mitochondrial) and varying interpretations of paleogeographic data.

Cladogram based on Amrine-Madsen, H. et al. (2003) and Asher, R. J. et al. (2009)

Genomics
, the genome has been sequenced for at least one species in each extant placental order and in 83% of families (105 of 127 extant placental families).

See list of sequenced animal genomes.

Evolutionary history
True placental mammals (the crown group including all modern placentals) arose from stem-group members of the clade Eutheria, which had existed since at least the Middle Jurassic period, about 170 mya. These early eutherians were small, nocturnal insect eaters, with adaptations for life in trees.

True placentals may have originated in the Late Cretaceous around 90 mya, but the earliest undisputed fossils are from the early Paleocene, 66 mya, following the Cretaceous–Paleogene extinction event. The species Protungulatum donnae is sometimes placed as a stem-ungulate  known 1 meter above the Cretaceous-Paleogene boundary in the geological stratum that marks the Cretaceous–Paleogene extinction event  and Purgatorius, sometimes considered a stem-primate, appears no more than 300,000 years after the K-Pg boundary; both species, however, are sometimes placed outside the crown placental group, but many newer studies place them back in eutherians. The rapid appearance of placentals after the mass extinction at the end of the Cretaceous suggests that the group had already originated and undergone an initial diversification in the Late Cretaceous, as suggested by molecular clocks. The lineages leading to Xenarthra and Afrotheria probably originated around 90 mya, and Boreoeutheria underwent an initial diversification around 70-80 mya, producing the lineages that eventually would lead to modern primates, rodents, insectivores, artiodactyls, and carnivorans.

However, modern members of the placental orders originated in the Paleogene around 66 to 23 mya, following the Cretaceous–Paleogene extinction event. The evolution of crown orders such modern primates, rodents, and carnivores appears to be part of an adaptive radiation that took place as mammals quickly evolved to take advantage of ecological niches that were left open when most dinosaurs and other animals disappeared following the Chicxulub asteroid impact. As they occupied new niches, mammals rapidly increased in body size, and began to take over the large herbivore and large carnivore niches that had been left open by the decimation of the dinosaurs (and perhaps more relevantly competing synapsids). Mammals also exploited niches that the non-avian dinosaurs had never touched: for example, bats evolved flight and echolocation, allowing them to be highly effective nocturnal, aerial insectivores; and whales first occupied freshwater lakes and rivers and then moved into the oceans. Primates, meanwhile, acquired specialized grasping hands and feet which allowed them to grasp branches, and large eyes with keener vision which allowed them to forage in the dark.

The evolution of land placentals followed different pathways on different continents since they cannot easily cross large bodies of water. An exception is smaller placentals such as rodents and primates, who left Laurasia and colonized Africa and then South America via rafting.

In Africa, the Afrotheria underwent a major adaptive radiation, which led to elephants, elephant shrews, tenrecs, golden moles, aardvarks, and manatees. In South America a similar event occurred, with radiation of the Xenarthra, which led to modern sloths, anteaters, and armadillos, as well as the extinct ground sloths and glyptodonts. Expansion in Laurasia was dominated by Boreoeutheria, which includes primates and rodents, insectivores, carnivores, perissodactyls and artiodactyls. These groups expanded beyond a single continent when land bridges formed linking Africa to Eurasia and South America to North America.

A study on eutherian diversity suggests that placental diversity was constrained during the Paleocene, while multituberculate mammals diversified; afterwards, multituberculates decline and placentals explode in diversity.

References

 
Mammal taxonomy
Extant Paleocene first appearances
Taxa named by Richard Owen